Protein phosphatase 1 regulatory subunit 17 is a protein that in humans is encoded by the PPP1R17 gene.

References

External links

Further reading